Palo Seco may refer to:

 Palo Seco, Catamarca, in Argentina
 Palo Seco Forest Reserve, in Panama
 Palo Seco, Maunabo, Puerto Rico, a barrio
 Palo Seco, Toa Baja, Puerto Rico, a barrio
 Palo Seco, Trinidad and Tobago
 Palo Seco Velodrome